Ackworth School is an independent day and boarding school located in the village of High Ackworth, near Pontefract, West Yorkshire, England. It is one of seven Quaker schools in England. The school (or more accurately its Head) is a member of the Headmasters' & Headmistresses' Conference and SHMIS The Head is Anton Maree, who took over at the beginning of the 2014–2015 academic year. The Deputy Head is Jeffrey Swales.

The school has a nursery that takes children aged 2 1/2 to 4, a Junior School that takes children age 5 to 11, and the Senior School for students aged 11 to 18. The boarding facilities cater for pupils from 10 years of age.

Originally it was a boarding school for Quaker children. Today most of the school's pupils are day pupils. There are more than 27 different nationalities in the boarding houses.

Most of today's pupils are not Quakers, but the school retains a strong Quaker ethos and is able to offer means-tested Bursary awards to children from Quaker and non-Quaker families. There is a very short Quaker-style silence at assembly and before meals. Once a week the School meets for a longer Meeting for Worship.

History
The school was founded by John Fothergill and others in 1779 as a boarding school for Quaker boys and girls. Prior to the school's foundation, the buildings housed a foundling hospital created by Thomas Coram.

School life

Houses
The school has four houses: Woolman, Gurney, Penn and Fothergill. Penn, Gurney and Woolman were all famous Quakers, and John Fothergill was the founder of the school. Every pupil is assigned to one of the four houses at the start of their time at the school for inter-house events, which include sport, music, drama, poetry and art.

Students are also divided for meals according to their houses.

Uniform
The school uniform consists of grey trousers, grey socks, light blue shirt, navy school tie, and navy-blue jumper for boys, and navy skirt, blue-and-white-striped blouse, and navy jumper for girls. Blazers are also part of the uniform for First-Fifth Year (Secondary School age).

The sixth form boys wear a white shirt and grey trousers with a burgundy jumper or black blazer, while sixth-form girls wear a white blouse and Navy skirt with a burgundy jumper.

Music
The school has a strong musical tradition. In 1995, a purpose-built music facility was built on the site of one of the old boarding houses, comprising a recital hall with seating for 180, 14 practice rooms, 2 classrooms, a music library and a recording studio. Summer schools are sometimes held there during school holidays.

In January 2019, Ackworth School became the 15th member of the All-Steinway Group of Schools.

Boarding
Boarders live in separate boys' and girls' boarding houses. Until 1997, the school timetable included Saturday morning lessons, leaving Wednesday afternoons free, providing a more-balanced week for boarders. The changing demographic of the school has led to this being phased out.

Sixth Form
When students reach the sixth form, they are all allocated a shared or single study in designated areas. There are two study blocks for Lower Sixth (known as the West Wing Studies and the Old Art Block), and two for Upper Sixth (known as the Fothergill Studies and the Old Library). Sixth formers have free periods during which they are encouraged to study. Students must stay within school premises during these free periods.

Charity Week
Each year in the week before October half term is Ackworth's Charity Week. Two charities, one national and one international, are chosen for which the school then raises money through a series of events. Included within these events are cake stalls, auctions, concerts and the sale of doughnuts and hot dogs. One event involves putting sixth formers in stocks and allowing younger students to throw water at them.

One of the most-popular events of Charity Week is the staff/sixth-form entertainment. The sixth form and certain members of staff are encouraged to prepare a series of sketches to entertain younger students. In the middle of the event, a fund-raising activity occurs, where the sixth form raise money from the other students.

On 18 October the school celebrates Founder's Day, the day on which in 1779 the school was founded. The whole school gathers in the Meeting House and sings the Founder's Day Hymn before each year group departs on a day trip, usually a walk.

Union with other Quaker schools
In 2007, the National Quaker Choral Festival was held at the school, where pupils from Quakers schools all over England came to sing in a large choir to Karl Jenkins' "The Armed Man".

On 28 March 2009, the Bridge Film Festival — which had been held at Brooklyn Friends School, located in Brooklyn, New York, for the last nine years — was held at the school. It is a Quaker film festival in which students make a film which is judged and prizes are awarded. The school entered the 2008 festival, sending several students to Brooklyn Friends School to witness the festival. For the 2009 festival, student Simon Waldock prepared a film about the history of the school; the film involved an interview with a former scholar from the 1950s. The film did not win but was commended by judges.

Notable alumni
The school's former pupils are called Ackworth Old Scholars. There is an active Old Scholars Association, with an annual Easter gathering in the school. Notable Old Scholars include:
Kweku Adoboli (born 1980), investment banker, convicted in the 2011 UBS rogue trader scandal
Lindsey Fawcett (born 1979), actress known for her role in ITV's Bad Girls
Henry Ashby (1846–1908), paediatrician
Henry Ashworth (1794–1880), cotton master
John Gilbert Baker (1834–1920), botanist
Geoffrey Barraclough (1908–1984), historian
Sir Henry Binns (1837–1899), prime minister of Natal, 1897–1899
William Arthur Bone (1871–1938), chemist fuel technologist
Henry Bowman Brady (1835–1891), naturalist and pharmacist
John Bright (1811–1889), politician
Basil Bunting (1900–1985), poet
Peter Christopherson (1955–2010), musician, video director and designer
Susanna Corder (1787–1864), educationist and Quaker biographer
Alfred Darbyshire (1839–1908), architect
Philip J Day (born 1959), documentary filmmaker
Henry Doubleday (1810–1902), starch manufacturer and comfrey cultivator
William Farrer Ecroyd (1827–1915), worsted manufacturer and politician
George Edmondson (1798–1863), headmaster of Queenwood Hall
Thomas Edmondson (1792–1851), inventor of the first railway-ticket printing machine
Sarah Stickney Ellis (1799–1872), writer and educationist
James Fearnley (born 1954), musician and member of The Pogues
Arthur Charles Fox-Davies (1871–1928), heraldist
Francis Frith (1822–1898), photographer
   Dominic Harrison (born 1997) Musician. Performing as Yungblud
   Marie Hartley (1905–2006), artist, writer, photographer and historian
William Howitt (1792–1879), writer
Sir Philip Hunter (born 1939), educationist
Sir Joseph Hutchinson (1902–1988), geneticist and professor of agriculture
William Allen Miller (1817–1870), chemist
John Howard Nodal (1831–1909), journalist and dialectologist
Jacob Post (1774–1855), Quaker religious writer
Sir James Reckitt (1833–1924), starch, blue and polish manufacturer
Anna Richardson (1806–1892), philanthropist, abolitionist and pacifist
Elizabeth Robson, (1771–1843), Quaker minister
Sanil Sachar (1992-), Indian author and poet
Jane Smeal (1801-1888), abolitionist
Sir Arthur Snelling (1914–1996), diplomat
Joseph Southall (1861–1944), painter and pacifist
Patric Standford (1939–2014), musical composer
Henry Tennant (1823–1910), general manager of the North Eastern Railway, 1870–1891
Kathleen Tillotson (1906–2001), literary scholar
Thomas Thomasson (1808–1876), cotton master
Samuel Tuke (1784–1857), philanthropist and asylum reformer
Benjamin Barron Wiffen (1794–1867), biographer
Jeremiah Holmes Wiffen (1792–1836), poet and translator
James Willstrop (born 1983), squash player
James Wilson (1805–1860), economist, founder of The Economist, politician, and financial member of the Council of India, 1859–1860
Rosie Winterton (born 1958), former Labour Chief Whip
Fiona Wood (born 1958), burns-treatment pioneer, Australian of the Year
Sarah Woodhead (born 1851), first (Girton College) woman to be awarded an Oxbridge degree – the equivalent of Senior Optime in Mathematics (1873)
Thomas William Worsdell (1838–1916), steam-locomotive engineer
Wilson Worsdell (1850–1920), railway engineer

Arms

See also
List of Friends Schools
Grade I listed buildings in West Yorkshire
Listed buildings in Ackworth, West Yorkshire

References

Further reading
 Ackworth School Annual Reports.
 Ackworth School, Then and Now: Ackworth School Bicentenary Exhibition Catalogue. (Pub. 1979).
 Alphabetical list of scholars 1779–1979.  Prepared by Arthur G. Olver, typescript.
 The Cupola: The Ackworth School Magazine, West Yorkshire Archives, Wakefield.
 Foulds, V.E. (1991). Ackworth School.
 Foulds, V.E. (1979). So Numerous a Family: 200 Years of Quaker Education at Ackworth.
 Thompson, H. (1879). A History of Ackworth School.
 Vipont, Elfrida (1959). Ackworth School: from its Foundation in 1779 to the Introduction of Co-Education in 1946. Lutterworth Press (London).
 Linney, Geo. F. (1853). The History of Ackworth School.

External links
ackworthschool.com, Ackworth School's official website

Internet archive: List of boys and girls admitted to Ackworth School: during the 100 years from 18th of 10th month, 1779, to the centenary celebration on the 27th of 6th month, 1879, published 1879

People educated at Ackworth School
Co-educational boarding schools
Educational institutions established in 1779
Private schools in the City of Wakefield
Member schools of the Headmasters' and Headmistresses' Conference
Organizations established in 1779
Quaker schools in England
1779 establishments in England